Robert La Caze (sometimes spelled La Gaze) (26 February 1917 – 1 July 2015) was a Moroccan-French racing driver. He was the first driver to race in Formula One under an African licence, and the only driver to race under a Moroccan licence.

Career

Early life
La Caze was born in Paris, but as the grandson of a French diplomat, he moved to Morocco at a young age and spent most of his life there. He started his motorsport career in rallying, taking part in many events across North Africa. He also became the Moroccan national skiing champion.

Sportscar races and rallies in Morocco
The event was held from 1950 to 1956, each year featuring multiple races for different engine classes. In 1951, he placed third in the S750 race. In 1952, he placed second in the S1.0 race. In 1953, he placed second in the S1.1 and S2.0 races. In 1954, he placed second in the S1.1 race. In 1955, he won the S1.0 race.

In 1951, La Caze participated in the Rallye du Maroc and finished sixth. In 1952, he finished third in the 12 Hours of Casablanca. In 1953, he won the 3 Hours of Safi and started the 3 Hours of Algeria and 12 Hours of Casablanca, but his result in either race is unclear. 1954 was particularly successful: he won the S1.1 and S1.5 races at the Marrakech Grand Prix, the S1.6 race at the Tangier Grand Prix, and the Rallye du Maroc for the first time. He was runner-up in the rally in 1955. Outside of Morocco, La Caze raced in the 1955 Mille Miglia, the 1956 Tour de France and the 1957 24 Hours of Le Mans.

Moroccan Grand Prix
The Moroccan Grand Prix returned in 1957, but it was run to Formula One regulations and local competitors could not afford to enter. The event organisers remedied this for the 1958 event, allowing Formula Two cars to enter in a separate class. La Caze secured an F2 entry with a privately owned Cooper. He lacked open-wheel racing experience, but impressed in practice by lapping within two seconds of the F2 class leaders. He qualified fourth out of the F2 entries and steadily improved his pace throughout the race, making a late pass on André Guelfi to secure third in the F2 class and 14th overall. However, the race was marred by Stuart Lewis-Evans's accident which ultimately proved to be fatal, and the Moroccan Grand Prix would not return.

Last races and later career
La Caze would race four times alongside Jean Kerguen, who had also been part of the Moroccan Grand Prix F2 field. In 1959, they competed at Le Mans and the Tour de France, finishing fourth overall in the latter. In 1960, they drove to 14th overall in the Rally Isla de Gran Canaria before returning to Le Mans. La Caze won the Rallye du Maroc for the second time in 1967, and drove again in 1968 but retired with an accident.

Following his motorsport career, La Caze ran a garage and a youth sports association in Marrakech. He was the oldest living World Championship driver from the death of Paul Pietsch in May 2012 until his own death in July 2015.

Racing record

Complete Formula One results
(key)

Complete 24 Hours of Le Mans results

External links
Robert La Caze at racingsportscars.com.

Footnotes

References

1917 births
2015 deaths
Moroccan racing drivers
French Formula One drivers
Moroccan Formula One drivers
Racing drivers from Paris
24 Hours of Le Mans drivers
World Sportscar Championship drivers